The demographic features of Brunei include population density, ethnicity, education level, health of the populace, economic status, religious affiliations and other aspects of the population. Like neighbouring countries, Brunei is a Malay-dominated country.  Many cultural and linguistic differences make Brunei Malays distinct from the larger Malay populations in nearby Malaysia and Indonesia, even though they are ethnically related and share the Muslim religion.

Brunei has a hereditary nobility with the title Pengiran these are, more often than not, related to the Sultan by blood. The Sultan can award to commoners the title Pehin, the equivalent of a life peerage awarded in the United Kingdom. The Sultan also can award his subjects the Dato, the equivalent of a knighthood in the United Kingdom, and Datin, the equivalent of a damehood.

Bruneians adhere to the practice of using complete full names with all titles, including the title Haji (for men) or Hajjah (for women) for those who have made the Haj pilgrimage to Mecca. Many Brunei Malay women wear the tudong, a traditional head covering. Men wear the songkok, a traditional Malay cap. Men who have completed the Haj wear a white songkok.

The requirements to attain Brunei citizenship include passing tests in Malay culture, customs and language. Stateless permanent residents of Brunei are given International Certificates of Identity, which allow them to travel overseas. The majority of Brunei's Chinese are permanent residents, and many are stateless.

Petroleum wealth allows the Brunei Government to provide the population with one of Asia's finest health care systems. The Brunei Medical and Health Department introduced the region's first government "flying doctor service" in early 1965. Malaria has been eradicated, and cholera is virtually nonexistent. There are three general hospitals—in Bandar Seri Begawan, Tutong, and Kuala Belait—and there are numerous health clinics throughout the country.

Education starts with preschool, followed by 6 years of primary education and up to 6 years of secondary education. Nine years of education are mandatory. Most of Brunei's college students attend universities and other institutions abroad, but approximately 2,542 study at the University of Brunei Darussalam. Opened in 1985, the university has a faculty of over 300 instructors and is located on a sprawling campus at Tungku, overlooking the South China Sea.

The official language is Malay, but English is widely understood and used in business. Other languages spoken are several Chinese dialects, Iban, and a number of native dialects. Islam is the official religion, but religious freedom is guaranteed under the constitution.

Population

The CIA World Factbook estimates the population at 450,565 as of July 2018.

UN estimates

Structure of the population

Median age

total: 30.5 years
male: 30 years
female: 31 years (2018 est.)

Population growth rate

1.55% (2018 est.)

Net migration rate

2.3 migrant(s)/1,000 population (2018 est.)

Sex ratio

at birth: 1.05 male(s)/female
0–14 years: 1.06 male(s)/female
15–24 years: 0.99 male(s)/female
25–54 years: 0.92 male(s)/female
55–64 years: 1.04 male(s)/female
65 years and over: 0.95 male(s)/female
total population: 0.98 male(s)/female (2017 est.)

Urbanization

Urban population: 77.6% of total population (2018)
Rate of urbanization: 1.66% annual rate of change (2015-20 est.)

Vital statistics

UN estimates
Data according to the United Nations' World Population Prospects.

Registered births and deaths
Data according to the United Nations Statistics Division.

Life expectancy at birth
total population: 75.52 years
male: 73.32 years
female: 77.83 years (2009 est.)

Ethnic groups

According to the 1991 census, Bruneian (Malay or also called Kedayan) were 67% of the population, Chinese were 16%, indigenous were 6%, and others (including Indians) were 12%. Indigenous groups include the Iban people, Murut (a branch of the Dayak people), the Dusun, and the Melanau.
According to the CIA World Factbook, in 2016 the Malay were 65.7%, Chinese were 10.3%, and others were 24%.

Languages

Malay (official), English, Chinese.

Religions

According to Brunei's official 2016 data:
Muslims (official): 80.9%
Christians: 7.1%
Buddhists: 7%
indigenous beliefs and non-religious, atheist or agnostic: 5%

HIV/AIDS

Adult prevalence rate: less than 0.1% (2003 est.)
People living with HIV/AIDS: less than 200 (2003 est.)
Deaths: less than 200 (2003 est.)

Nationality

Noun: Bruneian(s)
Adjective: Bruneian

Literacy

Definition: age 15 and over can read and write
Total population: 96%
Male: 97.5%
Female: 94.5% (2015 est.)

Education expenditures
4.4% of total GDP (2016)

See also 
 Ethnic Chinese in Brunei

References